FC Britannia Posen was a German association football club from the City of Posen, in German Reich. The short-lived club was established sometime within the first decade of the 20th century and lost in 1920 under the Polish rule.



History
Britannia joined the top-flight regional Südostdeutscher Fußballverband (SOFV, en:Southeast German Football Association) as the league grew to include Posen in 1909. The club made just a single appearance in the playoffs in 1912–13 when they were eliminated 1:0 in the qualifying round to Preußen Breslau. The following season the team lost the district Niederschlesien final 3:4 to DSV Posen.

Football competitions in many parts of Germany were disrupted between 1914 and 1918 by World War I. The country was in disorder following its defeat in the conflict and an uprising succeeded in restoring an independent Polish republic built around Poznań, which was the historic center of the country.

Competition in the SOFV was greatly reduced, but was resumed in the 1919–20 season. Play in the Posen district circuit collapsed and they did not send a representative to the regional playoffs. Britannia was one of many German football clubs in the area that was lost at the time.

Honours 
Posen Football Championship

 Champions: 1912–13

References

 Das deutsche Fußball-Archiv historical German domestic league tables 

Football clubs in Germany
Defunct football clubs in Germany
Defunct football clubs in former German territories
Association football clubs established in 1905
History of Poznań
Football clubs in Poznań
1905 establishments in Germany